There have been four baronetcies created for persons with the surname Leslie, one in the Baronetage of Nova Scotia, one in the Baronetage of Ireland, one in the Baronetage of Great Britain and one in the Baronetage of the United Kingdom. Three of the creations are extant as of 2010.

The Leslie Baronetcy, of Wardis and Findrassie in the County of Moray, was created in the Baronetage of Nova Scotia on 1 September 1625 for John Leslie, with remainder to his heirs male whatsoever. He was a descendant of the Leslies of Balquhain, from whom the Leslie Counts of the Holy Roman Empire are also descended (see Clan Leslie). On the death of the second Baronet in 1645, the title reverted to his uncle, William Leslie. However, he declined to assume the title as he would not also inherit the Wardis estate. His four sons all died childless. The title was assumed in circa 1800 by John Leslie, the fourth Baronet. He was a descendant of Norman Leslie, younger brother of the third Baronet. The presumed tenth Baronet has not successfully proven his succession and is not on the Official Roll of the Baronetage. For more information, follow this link. See also the Leslie Baronets of Glaslough below.

The Leslie, later Pepys Baronetcy, of Juniper Hill in the County of Surrey, was created in the Baronetage of Great Britain on 22 January 1784. For more information on this creation, see Earl of Cottenham.

The Leslie Baronetcy, of Tarbert in the County of Kerry, was created in the Baronetage of Ireland on 3 September 1787 for Edward Leslie. The title became extinct on his death in 1818.

The Leslie Baronetcy, of Glaslough in the County of Monaghan, was created in the Baronetage of the United Kingdom on 21 February 1876 for John Leslie, Conservative Member of Parliament for Monaghan. He was a descendant of John Leslie, Bishop of Clogher, son of George Leslie of Crichie, second son of Walter Leslie of Wardis and uncle of the first Baronet of the 1625 creation (see above). The third Baronet was a diplomat and writer. Lionel Alister David Leslie (1900–1987), fourth son of the second Baronet, was a sculptor, author and explorer. Desmond Leslie, younger son of the third Baronet, was a film maker, writer and musician. Anita Leslie, daughter of the third Baronet, was a writer (her works include Lady Randolph Churchill: The Story of Jennie Jerome). The Leslie Baronets of Glaslough are also in remainder to the Leslie Baronetcy of Wardis and Findrassie.

Leslie baronets, of Wardis and Findrassie (1625)

Sir John Leslie, 1st Baronet (died 1640)
Sir John Leslie, 2nd Baronet (died 1645)
Sir William Leslie, 3rd Baronet (died ) (did not assume title – dormant)
Sir John Leslie, 4th Baronet (–1825) (assumed title )
Sir Charles Abraham Leslie, 5th Baronet (1796–1847)
Sir Norman Robert Leslie, 6th Baronet (1822–1857)
Sir Charles Henry Leslie, 7th Baronet (1848–1905)
Sir Norman Roderick Alexander David Leslie, 8th Baronet (1889–1937)
Sir (Henry John) Lindores Leslie, 9th Baronet (1920–1967)
Dormant on his death.

Leslie, later Pepys baronets, of Juniper Hill (1784)
see Earl of Cottenham

Leslie baronets, of Tarbert (1787)

Sir Edward Leslie, 1st Baronet (1744–1818)

Leslie baronets, of Glaslough (1876)

Sir John Leslie, 1st Baronet (1822–1916)
Sir John Leslie, 2nd Baronet (1857–1944)
Sir John Randolph Leslie, 3rd Baronet (1885–1971)
Sir John Norman Ide Leslie, 4th Baronet (1916–2016)
Shaun Rudolf Christopher Leslie (b. 1947), is anticipated to be recognised as the 5th Baronet once he makes a formal application to be included on the Official Roll. As of 1 June 2021, the Baronetcy is regarded as 'Vacant'.

Shaun Leslie is the nephew of the 4th Baronet, who was unmarried.

The heir presumptive is the present holder's brother (Christopher) Mark Leslie (born 1952).
The heir presumptive's heir apparent is his only son Luke Daniel Leslie (born 1987).

Notes

References 
Public Record Office of Northern Ireland
Kidd, Charles, Williamson, David (editors). Debrett's Peerage and Baronetage (1990 edition). New York: St Martin's Press, 1990, 

 Tudor 16
 

Baronetcies in the Baronetage of the United Kingdom
Dormant baronetcies in the Baronetage of Nova Scotia
Extinct baronetcies in the Baronetage of Ireland
1625 establishments in Nova Scotia
1784 establishments in Great Britain
1787 establishments in Ireland
1876 establishments in the United Kingdom
Baronetcies created with special remainders
baronets